The Space Age Playboys is the fifth album by the band Warrior Soul. It was first released in the UK on Music For Nations in 1994.  It was released the following year in North America.

The album was remastered and re-released with bonus tracks on CD in 2006 by Escapi Music.

Critical reception

In 2005, The Space Age Playboys was ranked number 323 in Rock Hard magazine's book of The 500 Greatest Rock & Metal Albums of All Time.  Metallica's Lars Ulrich has rated it one of his favourite albums, and invited Warrior Soul to open for them at Donington.

Track listing
All songs written by Clark / McClanahan / X-Factor.

2006 Escapi bonus tracks

Personnel
Kory Clarke - vocals
Pete McClanahan - bass & vocals
X-Factor - guitar & vocals
Scott Duboys - drums

References

1995 albums
Warrior Soul albums